The Santu River is a small coastal river in the department of Haute-Corse, Corsica, France.

Course

It crosses the communes of Saint-Florent and Santo-Pietro-di-Tenda.
The Santu rises in the commune of Santo-Pietro-di-Tenda to the southeast of the  Monte Genova.
It flows in a generally northeast direction to enter the sea in the Golfe de Saint-Florent to the south of the Torra di Mortella.
The D81 runs past its source, but otherwise there are no roads along its course.

Environment

The small white sand beach at the river mouth with its turquoise water is popular with boaters coming from the port of Saint-Florent, as are other beaches of the Agriates Desert.

It is owned by the Conservatoire du littoral and managed by the department of Haute-Corse. 
It is important as a landscape and for its plant diversity.
It contains meadows of salt-tolerant rushes, with large populations of samphire that turn red in the fall.
The European pond turtle (Emys orbicularis) frequents the site.
Amphibians include the European green toad (Bufo viridis), the Sardinian tree frog (Hyla sarda) and the Tyrrhenian painted frog (Discoglossus sardus).
Birds include mallard (Anas platyrhynchos), little grebe (Tachybaptus ruficollis) and common moorhen (Gallinula chloropus).

Tributaries

The following streams (ruisseaux) are tributaries of the Santu, ordered by length, and sub-tributaries:

Suarella: 
Batagliola: 
Piedovalle: 
Panne Rossu: 
Teti: 
Paratella:

Notes

Sources

 

Rivers of Haute-Corse
Rivers of France
Coastal basins of the Mediterranean Sea in Corsica